The Timeform Chase was a National Hunt Conditions chase in England. 
It was run at Haydock Park over a distance of 2 miles and 4 furlongs (4,828 metres), and it took place each year in February.

The race was first run in 1981 and was run for the last time in February 1996.  The race was sponsored by Timeform until 1992, and in 1993 was run as the East Lancs Chase.
The race was sponsored by Black Death Vodka in 1995 and 1996 who continued their sponsorship when it became an ordinary handicap in 1997.

Winners

References
Racing Post
 

National Hunt chases
National Hunt races in Great Britain
Haydock Park Racecourse